Nicholas Charles Cater is a British-born Australian journalist and author who writes on culture and politics. He is a columnist for The Australian newspaper.

Early life and education
Cater was born in Billericay, Essex, and grew up in Hythe near Southampton. His parents were teachers. He graduated from the University of Exeter with an honours degree in sociology in 1980 and drove laundry vans for a year before joining the BBC as a trainee studio manager.

Career 
He worked as a producer in the London bureau of Australia's Channel Seven from 1983 to 1986 before rejoining the BBC as a journalist. He produced and directed the documentary Bridge Builders comparing the construction of the Tyne and Sydney Harbour Bridges.

Cater emigrated to Australia in July 1989, where he joined News Limited. He worked on The Advertiser in Adelaide and became group Asia correspondent in 1993, where he was best known for tracking down the paedophile Robert 'Dolly' Dunn, reported on the front page of The Daily Telegraph under the headline "Hello Dolly" on 17 April 1996.

Cater worked in senior editorial roles at The Daily Telegraph and The Sunday Telegraph in Sydney before joining The Australian in 2004. He was appointed editor of The Weekend Australian in 2007.

Cater left The Australian in September 2013, but continued to write a weekly column for it.

In 2014, Cater was appointed executive director of the Menzies Research Centre. where he was instrumental in founding the Robert Menzies Institute a library, exhibition and research institute dedicated to the legacy of former prime minister Sir Robert Menzies, housed in the heritage Quad building on the University of Melbourne's Parkville campus. He co-curated of the Institute's permanent exhibition with Dr David Kemp. Cater is a regular commentator on Sky News Australia, he hosts the weekly show Battleground on Alan Jones's ADH TV and co-hosts the weekly podcast The Six O'Clock Swill with Tim Blair.

Defamation case
In 2015, the Wagner family, of Toowoomba, Queensland, sued him for defamation over comments he made in broadcasts and in print about the cause of the floods in that town in 2011, in which 12 people died. Justice Peter Flanagan dismissed the complaints against Cater relating to comments he made on radio, however The Spectator (Australia) settled out of court over comments Cater made in an article. In September 2019, a jury found that Cater had defamed the Wagners with comments he made in a television broadcast.

Publications

The Lucky Culture 
The Lucky Culture and the Rise of an Australian Ruling Class (2013) was described as a manifesto for a counter revolution against the age of political correctness by Peter Coleman, who wrote "every 50 years or so Australians need a new book marking the end of an era and the start of a new one".

Two Australian prime ministers launched the book at separate events. John Howard endorsed the book in Sydney and it was given a qualified endorsement by Kevin Rudd in Brisbane two months later. The former Australian prime minister, Tony Abbott, described The Lucky Culture as a "beautifully written and perceptive… historical essay". Among others who greeted the book favourably are Boris Johnson, Geoffrey Blainey, Miranda Devine, Keith Windschuttle, Janet Albrechtsen, Julie Bishop and Jack Snelling. Chris Bowen and Peter Craven gave qualified endorsements. The former Labor leader Mark Latham was among the book's leading critics, writing, "It takes a fair bit to offend me these days but Nick Cater's new book The Lucky Culture and the Rise of an Australian Ruling Class has done the trick." The former Labor speechwriter Bob Ellis called for the book to be pulped, calling it "a loathsome shallow Murdochist piece of Pommy filth".

Other critics include the journalist Guy Rundle of Crikey and the historian Frank Bongiorno.

Other works
Cater was editor of the 2006 book, The Howard Factor, a review of the first decade of the John Howard government.

He co-edited with Helen Baxendale a selection of the writings of Christopher Pearson under the title A Better Class of Sunset (2014), with introductions by Tony Abbott and Jack Snelling.

Cater contributed the chapter "Barons versus bureaucrats: the history of the grain trade in North America and Australia" to Only in Australia. The History, Politics and Economics of Australian Exceptionalism (2016).

Cater co-authored The Road to Freedom: The Origins of Australia's Greatest Political Party (2019) with John Nethercote, and wrote the lead chapter in Australia Tomorrow (2022).

References

External links 
Nick Cater, The Australian

Australian newspaper editors
The Australian journalists
Living people
1958 births
English expatriates in Australia
People from Billericay
Alumni of the University of Exeter
BBC newsreaders and journalists